The Poncione di Piotta is a mountain of the Swiss Lepontine Alps, located between Lavertezzo and Moleno in the canton of Ticino. It lies on the chain that separates the valley of Verzasca (west) from the Leventina valley (east).

References

External links
 Poncione di Piotta on Hikr

Mountains of the Alps
Mountains of Switzerland
Mountains of Ticino
Lepontine Alps